Eleftherios "Lefteris" Kosmidis (Greek: Ελευθέριος "Λευτέρης" Κοσμίδης; born 6 May 1991) in Greece is an international elite artistic gymnast and a former world champion on Men's Floor Exercise. He was named the 2010 Greek Male Athlete of the Year.

Early life 
Kosmidis was born on May 6, 1991, in Athens, Greece to parents, Thanasis and Sofia Kosmidis; both of whom were elite gymnasts. Similarly, his brother, Xenofon, has competed internationally as an elite gymnast. They both participated at the 2006 European Men's Artistic Gymnastics Championships. He commenced gymnastics training at the age of five.

Career

2006–08: Junior career

2006
Kosmidis came fourth in both the European Junior Championship in 2006.

2007
On October 28, 2007,  Kosmidis won a Bronze medal on Floor at the gymnastics World Cup in Stuttgart. He went on to compete at the World Cup Grand Prix in Glasgow, winning two medals: silver in the floor exercise and bronze on Vault.

2008
In 2008, Kosmidis became Junior European champion on the Men's Floor Exercise ahead of Christian Bazan and Daniel Keatings with a score of 15.525. He went on to win Bronze medals on Floor at the World Cup Grand Prix in Glasgow once again later that year.

2009–present: Senior career

2009
In 2009, he competed as a Senior at the European Championships in Milan winning a Bronze medal on Floor Exercise.

2010
In 2010 he won a Silver medal on Floor at the European Championships in Birmingham behind Matthias Farhig. He went on to compete at the World Championships in Rotterdam where qualified to the Floor final in 1st place. In the final competition he won a Gold medal on Floor with a score of 15.700, beating All-Around champion Kohei Uchimura and Daniel Purvis.

2011
In 2011 he failed to qualify for the Floor Exercise final at the World Championships in Tokyo, coming in 10th place in the qualification round. He returned to compete at the World Championships in Antwerp in 2013 but once again did not qualify for any of the finals.

2014
In 2014 he competed at the World Championships in Nanning, China. He placed 7th on Floor Exercise in qualifications with a score of 15.533 qualifying him to the Individual Floor Exercise Final.

Personal life 
At present, Kosmidis is studying physiotherapy at the Technological Educational Institute of Athens. Additionally, he enjoys playing the guitar and supporting the football club AEK Athens.

References

External links
 

Living people
1991 births
Greek male artistic gymnasts
Medalists at the World Artistic Gymnastics Championships
Mediterranean Games gold medalists for Greece
Competitors at the 2009 Mediterranean Games
Competitors at the 2013 Mediterranean Games
Mediterranean Games medalists in gymnastics
20th-century Greek people
21st-century Greek people
Gymnasts from Athens

el:Λευτέρης Κοσμίδης